Martha Julia is a Mexican actress. She is best known for playing Isadora Duarte Montalvo in the telenovela Destilando Amor.

Career
Martha Julia debuted as soap opera actress in 1995 playing Consuelo Flores, a mistress, in the melodrama El premio mayor. Two years later she returned as the same character in Salud, dinero y amor. She returned to television in 2001 in the soap opera Amigas y rivales playing the character of Margarita.

She acted in the soap operas Las vías del amor (2002) and Luciana y Nicolás (2003), the latter which was filmed in Peru. In May 2004, she participated as a housemate/tenant in Big Brother VIP 3 (Part 2). In 2005, she acted in the soap opera La Madrastra as the character Ana Rosa.

Later in 2007, Martha Julia was in the soap opera Destilando Amor playing the antagonist Isadora. In 2008, she joined the cast of Alma de Hierro as Paty, which was produced by Roberto Gómez Fernández.

In 2010, she was a villain in Niña de mi corazón, a production of Pedro Damián, playing the character Tamara. In October of that same year, she had a role as a maid-of-honor in Soy tu dueña, a production of Nicandro Díaz González. Later that year she joined the cast of Cuando me enamoro, produced by Carlos Moreno Laguillo, in the role of Marina.

Martha Julia played the antagonist Flor Escutia in Corona de lágrimas.

Filmography

Television roles

External links
 

Living people
Mexican telenovela actresses
Mexican television actresses
People from Culiacán
Actresses from Sinaloa
20th-century Mexican actresses
21st-century Mexican actresses
Year of birth missing (living people)